Trip.com Group Limited (formerly Ctrip.com International) is a Chinese multinational online travel company that provides services including accommodation reservation, transportation ticketing, packaged tours and corporate travel management. Founded in 1999, the company owns and operates Trip.com, Skyscanner,  Qunar, Travix, and Ctrip, all of which are online travel agencies.

Founded in 1999, it is currently the largest online travel agency (OTA) in China and one of the largest travel service providers in the world.

History
The company was founded by James Liang, Neil Shen, Min Fan, and Qi Ji in June 1999.

The company was listed on the NASDAQ in 2003 through a variable interest entity (VIE) based in the Cayman Islands in a Merrill Lynch-led offering, raising US$75 million from the sale of 4.2 million American depositary receipts at $18 each. It appreciated 86% to close at $33.94 per ADR in its first day of trading. The stock traded at a peak of $37.35 on its first day of trading, making it the first company since the November 2000 IPO of Transmeta to double its price in the first day of trading.

In 2006, about 70% of the company's sales came from just four cities in China: Beijing, Guangzhou, Shanghai, and Shenzhen.

On August 6, 2014, Priceline.com, announced that it will invest $500 million in the company to broaden the companies’ options in China. Priceline and Ctrip, which have had a commercial partnership since 2012, will increase their cross-promotion of each company's hotel inventory and other travel services, the companies said in a statement.

In May 2015, Booking Holdings (formerly The Priceline Group) announced it would be investing an additional $250 million in the company.

In November 2016, the company acquired Skyscanner for £1.4 billion. That same month, Jane Jie Sun became the CEO of Ctrip. She had joined the company in 2005.

On November 1, 2017, Ctrip acquired Trip.com, rebranding it as its global brand website.

In February 2018, Ctrip launched TrainPal, an online ticketing platform featuring split ticketing, in the United Kingdom. Accredited by the National Rail of the UK, TrainPal mainly provides services for the UK, and other European countries.

In September 2019, Ctrip completed a share exchange with Naspers and became the single largest shareholder of MakeMyTrip.

On October 25, 2019, at its 2019 annual general meeting of shareholders, it was approved to change the Company name from "Ctrip.com International, Ltd." to "Trip.com Group Limited".

In June 2020, Trip.com joined China Eastern to launch new airline in Hainan as plans to make the island a free trade hub promise greater air traffic.

On April 19, 2021, Trip.com Group was officially listed on the Hong Kong Stock Exchange.

Remote work
The company is a proponent of scientific management. After a 2012 randomized control trial using 242 employees and sponsored by professors at Stanford University and Peking University found that employees randomly assigned to remote work for 9 months increased their output by 13.5% versus the office-based control group, and their turnover rates fell by almost 50%, the company allowed remote work company-wide.

References

External links

 Trip.com USA site

 
Online travel agencies
Online companies of China
Travel and holiday companies of China
Chinese companies established in 1999
Hospitality companies established in 1999
Internet properties established in 1999
2003 initial public offerings
Chinese brands
Silver Lake (investment firm) companies
Companies listed on the Nasdaq
Companies based in Shanghai